Lest Darkness Fall is an alternate history science fiction novel written in 1939 by American author L. Sprague de Camp.  Alternate history author Harry Turtledove has said it sparked his interest in the genre as well as his desire to study Byzantine history.

Lest Darkness Fall is similar in concept to Mark Twain's A Connecticut Yankee in King Arthur's Court, but the treatment is very different.

Publication history
A short story version was first published in Unknown #10, December 1939. The complete novel was published by Henry Holt and Company on the 24th of February 1941 and reprinted by both Galaxy Publishing and Prime Press in 1949. The first British edition was published in hardcover by Heinemann in 1955. The first paperback edition was published by Pyramid Books in February 1963 and reprinted in August 1969. A later paperback edition was issued by Ballantine Books in August 1974 and reprinted in 1975, 1979 and 1983; the Ballantine edition was also issued in hardcover by the Science Fiction Book Club in April 1979 and reprinted in 1996. The importance of the work was recognized by its inclusion in The Easton Press's series The Masterpieces of Science Fiction in 1989. The book has also been collected with David Drake's novella "To Bring the Light" in Lest Darkness Fall and To Bring the Light (Baen Books, 1996), with other works by de Camp in Years in the Making: the Time-Travel Stories of L. Sprague de Camp (NESFA Press, 2005), and with works by other authors in Lest Darkness Fall and Related Stories (Phoenix Pick, 2011). An E-book edition was published by Gollancz's SF Gateway imprint on September 29, 2011 as part of a general release of de Camp's works in electronic form. Galaxy's Edge magazine reprinted Lest Darkness Fall over four issues starting in August 2014, repeating a typographical error that appears in Lest Darkness Fall and Related Stories ("have" for "lave" in Padway's seduction scene).

Plot summary
American archaeologist Martin Padway is visiting the Pantheon in Rome in 1938.  A thunderstorm arrives, lightning cracks, and he finds himself transported to Rome in the year 535 AD.  At this time, the Italian Peninsula is under the rule of the Kingdom of the Ostrogoths.  The novel depicts their rule as a relatively benevolent despotism, allowing freedom of religion and maintaining the urban Roman society they had conquered, though slavery is common and torture is the normal method of interrogation by what passes for law-enforcement agencies.

In the real timeline, the Byzantine or Eastern Roman Empire temporarily expanded westwards, embarking on what came to be known as the Gothic War (535–554).  They overthrew the Ostrogoths in Italy and the Vandals in North Africa, but this war devastated the Italian urbanized society that required the support of intensive agriculture and by the end of the conflict Italy was severely depopulated: its population is estimated to have decreased from 7 million to 2.5 million people.  The great cities of Roman times were abandoned and the Byzantines never fully consolidated their rule over Italy, which faced further invasions by the Lombards; Italy fell into a long period of decline.  Some historians consider this the true beginning of the Dark Ages in Italy.  The city of Rome was besieged three times and many of its inhabitants did not survive to the end of the war.  Thus Padway, finding himself in this Rome and knowing what the near future holds in store, must act not only to preserve the future of civilization, but to improve his personal chances of survival. 

Padway initially wonders whether he is dreaming or delusional, but he quickly accepts his fate and sets out to survive.  As an archaeologist, he has enough understanding of various devices used before his time, but after the sixth century, to be able to reproduce them by the means available.  He can speak both modern Italian and Classical Latin, and quickly learns enough Vulgar Latin (which was spoken at that time) to communicate effectively.  Most crucially, Padway has read with great attention the book of the historian Procopius, who described the very war at whose outset Padway finds himself.  Though not in possession of a physical copy of Procopius when hurled back in time, Padway remembers the book in great detail, down to details of the time and route of the various armies' moves and their tactical and strategic considerations, as well as the convoluted and violent power struggles of the various contenders for the Gothic Kingship.  Thus Padway, in effect, knows the direct, immediate future of the country where he lives and often of individual people whom he meets (at least, until he acts in a way that changes that future).  In addition to this specialized and uniquely useful knowledge of the current war, Padway has taken a general interest in military history, which he is eventually able to put to very practical purposes.

Padway's first idea, after he concludes that it is no illusion and that he is truly in the past, is to make a copper still and sell brandy for a living.  He persuades a banker, Thomasus the Syrian, to lend him seed money to start his endeavor.  He teaches his clerks Arabic numerals and double entry bookkeeping.  Padway eventually develops a printing press, issues a newspaper, and builds a crude semaphore telegraph system utilizing small telescopes.  However, he does not manage to produce a mechanical clock, and temporarily halts his experiments to reinvent gunpowder and cannons. He becomes increasingly involved in the politics of the state as Italy is invaded by the Imperials and also threatened from the south and east.

Padway rescues the recently deposed Thiudahad and becomes his quaestor.  He uses the king's support to gather forces to defeat the formidable Imperial general Belisarius.  Padway manages to surprise Belisarius with tactics never used in the ancient world.  Then, deceiving the Dalmatian army, Padway reinstates the senile Thiudahad and imprisons King Wittigis as a hostage.  In 537, when Wittigis is killed and Thiudahad descends into madness, Padway has a protégé of his, Urias, married off to Mathaswentha, then crowned king of the Ostrogoths. He also tricks Justinian I into releasing Belisarius from his oath of allegiance and quickly enlists the military genius to command an army against the Franks.

The landing of an Imperial army at Vibo, led by Bloody John, and a rebellion, led by the son of Thiudahad, threaten the Ostrogothic kingdom and its army is destroyed at Crathis Valley.  Padway assembles a new force, spreads an "emancipation proclamation" to the Italian serfs and recalls Belisarius after his defeat of the Franks.  The armies clash near Calatia and then Benevento.  Despite the lack of discipline of his Gothic forces, some simple tactical tricks and the nick-of-time arrival of Belisarius secure Padway's victory.

At the end of the novel Padway has stabilized the Italo-Gothic kingdom, introduced a constitution, arranged the end of serfdom, and liberated the Burgunds, and is having boats built for an Atlantic expedition (as he wants to get tobacco).  The king of the Visigoths has appointed Urias as his heir, reunifying the Goths.  Ultimately, due to Padway's actions, Europe will not experience what Age of Enlightenment thinkers retroactively called the Dark Ages: "darkness will not fall".

Main characters

 Martin Padway (self-Latinized as Martinus Paduei): Protagonist. Transported from 1938 Rome to its 535 equivalent.
 Nevitta Gummund's son: Gothic farmer, Padway's best friend in ancient Rome.
 Thomasus the Syrian: Banker and confidant of Padway. Often invokes God's name, especially while bickering.
 Fritharik Staifan's son: Deposed Vandal noble, who becomes Padway's bodyguard and right-hand man. Often laments the loss of his beautiful Carthage estate and remarks that they will eventually all end up in unmarked graves.
 Julia from Apulia: A servant hired by Padway who has a one-night stand with him.
 Dorothea: Daughter of Cornelius Anicius and love interest for Padway.
 Leo Vekkos: Greek physician called in by Nevitta, against Padway's protests, to treat his cold.
 Count Honorius: City prefect/governor.
 Liuderis: Commander of the Goths' garrison in Rome.
 Thiudahad: King of the Ostrogoths and Italians. He is deposed and replaced by Wittigis, but is brought back under Padway's influence.
 Thiudegiskel: The pompous son of Thiudahad. He is usually found surrounded by his posse of friends, using his position to put anyone who wrongs him in trouble.
 Urias: Nephew of Wittigis and an ally of Padway's. Becomes king with Padway's help after Thiudahad is no longer fit to rule.
 Mathaswentha: Daughter of Amalswentha and the other love interest for Padway. Their brief romance is cut short when she decides, to Padway's horror, to have any competition killed. Padway sets her up with Urias, whom she marries.
 Belisarius: General of the Eastern Roman Empire. Eventually persuaded by Padway to join the Gothic army.

Sequels by other hands
Several short story sequels to Lest Darkness Fall, written by other authors, have appeared over the years. "The Apotheosis of Martin Padway", written by S. M. Stirling, appeared in Harry Turtledove's 2005 tribute anthology honoring L. Sprague de Camp, The Enchanter Completed, and the 2011 Arc Manor anthology Lest Darkness Fall and Related Stories. It offers glimpses of what might have become of the reality Padway altered, both during his old age and a few hundred years later.

"Temporal Discontinuity" by David Weber, appeared in the second edition of the Arc Manor anthology, retitled Lest Darkness Fall and Timeless Tales Written in Tribute (2021); it was newly commissioned for the edition. It is another direct sequel, though incompatible with Stirling's "The Apotheosis of Martin Padway." Like "Apotheosis," it also involves a future time-traveler investigating Padway's temporal disruptions, only she thinks he's a criminal from her own time who set out to change the timeline on purpose - a crime punishable by death. When agent Yawen Clasen-Hamatti confronts Padway in person, she discovers her mistake and has a moral dilemma on her hands.

The other story, "The Fake Pandemic," by Harry Turtledove, was also commissioned for the second edition of the Arc Manor anthology. It is also a direct sequel to de Camp's novel, compatible with Stirling's but not Weber's. In it, Padway recruits the Byzantine jurist Tribonian in an effort to prevent the Plague of Justinian. The story follows Tribonian as he proceeds to secure the emperor Justinian I's permission and support to do just that, and follows him on his successful if thankless mission (Justinian may be supportive, but he is far from grateful).

Related works
Subsequent to Lest Darkness Fall, de Camp wrote two subsequent works with similar themes: "The Wheels of If" (1940) and "Aristotle and the Gun" (1958).

Direct responses to Lest Darkness Fall include the stories "The Deadly Mission of Phineas Snodgrass" (1962) by Frederik Pohl, and "The Man Who Came Early" (1956) by Poul Anderson. In the Pohl tale, a man travels back to 1 BC and teaches modern medicine, causing a population explosion. It ends with the fantastically overpopulated alternate timeline sending someone back to assassinate the title character, allowing darkness to fall for thankful billions. It was reprinted in the anthologies The Enchanter Completed (2005) and Lest Darkness Fall and Related Stories (2011). The Anderson piece is a tale of an American airman sent by a storm (like Padway) to Saga Age Iceland; in this instance, the outcome proves tragic due to cultural minunderstandings and a poor fit between the protagonist's attempted innovations and local needs.

Another story inspired by Lest Darkness Fall is "To Bring The Light", by David Drake, published together with the original in the 1996 Baen double Lest Darkness Fall and To Bring The Light and the 2011 anthology Lest Darkness Fall and Related Stories. This story features Flavia Herosilla, a well-educated woman living in ancient Rome at its height. Like Padway, she is sent back in time by a lightning strike, in her case to the era of Rome's beginnings around 751 BC. Unlike Padway, who tries to change history, Flavia tries to recreate the founding of Rome based on the legends that she knows. But there is one detail she does want to change. The legends tell that on the day of Rome's founding, Romulus killed his brother Remus - and while in the process of making sure that Rome will be founded, Flavia Herosilla had fallen in love with Remus.

Several editions of Lest Darkness Fall, including the one printed with "To Bring the Light", repeat an error in the sequence where Padway and Julia from Apulia are setting up their one night stand: in the original text a somewhat inebriated Padway says Julia's dirty feet form a barrier and "I must lave the pedal extremities...".  Apparently some editor failed to recognize "lave" as a synonym for "wash" and turned the word into "have".

Reception
Jo Walton wrote, "In 1939, L. Sprague de Camp came up with one of the wonderful ideas of science fiction, the man taken out of his time to a time of lower technology... As soon as Padway's there, he puts his head down and starts to concentrate on what makes these books such fun—improvising technology from what he knows and can find around him. Padway starts with distilling and double-entry bookkeeping and makes his way up to newspapers and heliographs... The more you know history, the more you can see how clever the book is... De Camp was a historian of technology. His The Ancient Engineers (1963) is a... fascinating non-fiction book." Stating that it "is an excellent introduction to Rome at the time of the Gothic invasion", Carl Sagan in 1978 listed Lest Darkness Fall as an example of how science fiction "can convey bits and pieces, hints and phrases, of knowledge unknown or inaccessible to the reader".
 
Boucher and McComas praised the novel as "a witty version of the Connecticut Yankee theme, distinguished by its lore of Gothic Rome." Algis Budrys termed it "marvelous," rating it as "Maybe the best [book] DeCamp ever wrote." P. Schuyler Miller wrote that "Next to Wells's "Time Machine", this could be the best time-travel novel ever written."

Citations

General and cited sources

External links 
 
 
 Lest Darkness Fall, the short story and novel, on the Internet Archive

1941 American novels
1941 science fiction novels
Alternate history novels set in ancient Rome
American science fiction novels
Cultural depictions of Justinian I
Fiction set in 1938
Henry Holt and Company books
Novels about time travel
Novels by L. Sprague de Camp
Novels set in the 6th century
Novels set in the Byzantine Empire
Religion in science fiction
Works originally published in Unknown (magazine)